Clavileño the Swift is a fictional wooden horse, notable in both European and Near Eastern folklore, also appearing in chapters 40 and 41 of the second part of  the adventures of Don Quixote. It is governed by a pin in its forehead.

Don Quixote and Sancho Panza are tricked into using Clavileño, believing they have flown blindfolded and have controlled the horse with a peg in its head. The Dueña Dolorida (Countess Trifaldi) asserts that she and her ladies will be free of their charmed beards if knight and squire fly on the magical horse, sent by the sorcerer Malambruno. In reality the rocking horse is inanimate and goes nowhere, meanwhile explosives are planted near it to simulate a crash landing. Sancho Panza later goes on to say that he lifted his blindfold while "in flight" and saw the sky.

In Spanish, "peg" is clavija and "wood", leño, hence the name.

Clavileño is shown by some units of the Spanish Air and Space Force in its badges.

Further reading
 "A Horse of a Different Color: Salvador Dalí and the Re-imagining of Clavileño" by S. Alleyn Smythe in Don Quixote: The Re-accentuation of the World’s Greatest Literary Hero, Bucknell University Press (2017)
 "The Practice of Theory" in Cervantes, Literature, and the Discourse of Politics by Anthony J. Cascardi, University of Toronto Press (2012)
Benet's Reader's Encyclopedia (fourth edition), .

See also

 Rocinante, Don Quixote's real ride, made of flesh and blood (or rather bones and blood).

References

Don Quixote characters
Fictional horses
Literary characters introduced in 1605